Action Ornaments is a 1997 album by Trumans Water, released by the Runt Records label.  It features guest appearances by Azalia Snail (on tracks 4 and 8) and Chan Marshall (on track 12).

Track listing 
 "3 Straps Nose to Rear" 3:29
 "4 Story Friend" 4:15
 "A Hurting Helping" 2:58
 "Mood Strain" 1:50
 "Angels Spit Stars" 1:21
 "Skeeter Dope" 3:16
 "Gold Plated Pissin Troff" 4:33
 "Mutual Blood Tied Force" 3:51
 "Curl Up to Yer Empty Years" 1:56
 "Restore Restore and Destroy" 2:58
 "Flying in a Coin Operated Universe" 4:20
 "Shoe Lace or Else" 2:19
 "Care Sliced Lies" 9:08

References 

1997 albums
Trumans Water albums